Prank Academy is an American series produced exclusively for YouTube Red, which starred Jesse Wellens & Jeana Smith. The series premiered on March 30, 2016. The season finale was released on July 20, 2016. The 18 episodes series is produced by NorthSouth Productions.

The hidden camera series followed Jesse Wellens & Jeana Smith as they teach  Internet celebrities to pull off pranks on other people.

Episodes

Season 1

References 

2016 web series debuts
2016 web series endings
2016 American television series debuts
2016 American television series endings
YouTube original programming